Mersad Kovačević (born 15 October 1956) is a retired Bosnian football player.

Club career
Mersad Kovačević was prolific forward who played for Bosnian club Sloboda Tuzla and Turkish giants Beşiktaş and Galatasaray. He ended his career playing in second league for Göztepe SK. During times spent in Turkey he was known as Mirsat Güneş. Also, his name is sometimes spelled Mirsad.

He appeared for Galatasaray in the 1988-89 European Cup, playing against Steaua București in the semifinal.

References

External sources
 
 stats

1956 births
Living people
Sportspeople from Tuzla
Association football forwards
Yugoslav footballers
FK Sloboda Tuzla players
Beşiktaş J.K. footballers
Galatasaray S.K. footballers
Göztepe S.K. footballers
Yugoslav First League players
Süper Lig players
Yugoslav expatriate footballers
Expatriate footballers in Turkey
Yugoslav expatriate sportspeople in Turkey